Riblak, also known as Rah Balag or Rahbalak or Ribalag, may refer to:
 Riblak-e Olya
 Riblak-e Sofla